Asthenotricha furtiva is a moth in the family Geometridae. It is found in Madagascar.

References

Moths described in 1960
furtiva
Moths of Madagascar
Moths of Africa
Endemic fauna of Madagascar